Charisia may refer to:

 Charisia (city), an ancient Greek city
 Charisia (beetle), a genus in the tribe Rhinotragini
 Charisia, an ancient festival in honour of the Charites
 Charisia, a flower that grew at the Taygetus